Meridian High School is a public high school in Meridian, Mississippi. It is within the Meridian Public School District.

 its enrollment is about 1,700.

History
It was established in 1886.

It was named a 1984-1985 National Blue Ribbon School.

Meridian Senior High School and Junior College was listed in the National Register of Historic Places on May 29, 2014.

Notable alumni

Howard W. Gilmore (1919) U.S. Navy Medal of Honor in 1943
Susan Akin (1982) Miss America in 1986
Big K.R.I.T. (2004) rapper and record producer 
Raekwon Davis (2016) NFL defensive tackle for the Miami Dolphins
John Fleming (1969), Republican Representative of Louisiana's 4th congressional district from 2009 to 2017.
Rodney Hood (2011) NBA player
Derrick McKey (1984) NBA player
Oil Can Boyd (1977) MLB Pitcher
Tom Stuart (1955), mayor of Meridian, Mississippi from 1973 to 1977.
Joni Taylor (1997) head women's basketball coach for the Georgia Lady Bulldogs
Kenyatta Walker (1997), offensive tackle for the Tampa Bay Buccaneers
Charles Young Jr. (1980) Mississippi House of Representatives
Jeremy Sande (2000) Actor

See also
 National Register of Historic Places listings in Lauderdale County, Mississippi

References

External links
 

Public high schools in Mississippi
Education in Lauderdale County, Mississippi
National Register of Historic Places in Lauderdale County, Mississippi
Meridian, Mississippi
1886 establishments in Mississippi
Educational institutions established in 1886